A pair of rookies named Smith gave Buffalo fans reason for a bright future. The Braves repeated their 22–60 record from their inaugural season, and occupied the Atlantic Division basement. Elmore Smith and Randy Smith each had out standing rookie seasons with Elmore averaging 17.3 points per game and 15.2 rebounds per game, while Randy added 13.4 points per game.

Draft picks

Roster
{| class="toccolours" style="font-size: 95%; width: 100%;"
|-
! colspan="2" style="background-color: #000000;  color: #F15110; text-align: center;" | Buffalo Braves 1971–72 roster
|- style="background-color: #F15110; color: #000000;   text-align: center;"
! Players !! Coaches
|-
| valign="top" |
{| class="sortable" style="background:transparent; margin:0px; width:100%;"
! Pos. !! # !! Nat. !! Name !! Ht. !! Wt. !! From
|-

Regular season

Season standings

z – clinched division title
y – clinched division title
x – clinched playoff spot

Record vs. opponents

Game log

Player statistics
Note: GP= Games played; MPG = Minutes per game; FG% = Field goal percentage; FT% = Free throw percentage; RPG = Rebounds per game; APG = Assists per game; PPG = Points per game

Awards and honors
 Bob Kauffman, NBA All-Star

Transactions
The Braves were involved in the following transactions during the 1971–72 season.

Coaching Change

Trades

Free agents

Additions

Subtractions

References

 Braves on Database Basketball
 Braves on Basketball Reference

Buffalo
Buffalo Braves seasons
Buffalo
Buffalo